Central Parade formerly Cenegal FC, is a Sierra Leonean football club from the capital Freetown, Sierra Leone currently a member of the Sierra Leone National Premier League which is the top football division in Sierra Leone. Sport Director is Noel Kitami Horton.

Performance in CAF competitions
CAF Confederation Cup: 1 appearance
2010 – Preliminary Round

Current squad

Out on loan
As of 7 July 2012

Notable players
 Lamin "Obreh" Conteh
 Mumini Khomson Kamara

Notable Coaches
 Derrick Boison
 Abdulia Bah
 AD Koroma

Football clubs in Sierra Leone
2006 establishments in Sierra Leone
Association football clubs established in 2006